The Bard of Blood  is a 2015  Indo-Pakistani fictional espionage thriller novel  written by debutant author, Bilal Siddiqi. He wrote the novel at the age of 20 during his college days in Mumbai. It was published by Penguin books.

Plot
Kabir Anand, is a former Research and Analysis Wing (RAW) agent and now a professor of Shakespeare in Mumbai. He was forced to leave RAW after a disastrous mission in Balochistan. He is called by the agency to return after Sadiq Sheikh, his ex-boss is killed. Meanwhile, Mullah Omar and the ISI are also after him.

Development
Siddiqi said that he got a "sudden growing interest in the covert world of espionage" at the age of 17 and "the entire talk of jihad and Islamic extremism that plagued every newspaper." He started writing it at the age of 19 and later met Chiki Sarkar, the then Chief Editor of Penguin Books, through Hussain Zaidi whom he had been assisting for a few years. Zaidi had recommended Siddiqui's name to Sarkar. She read the half manuscript and then decided to publish it. It took him "roughly a year" to write the novel.

Adaptation

In November 2017, it was announced that a Netflix original seven-episode series will be made based on the novel, co-produced by Shah Rukh Khan. The screenplay is written by Siddiqui. The cast includes Emraan Hashmi, Vineet Kumar Singh, Kirti Kulhari, Sobhita Dhulipala, Jaideep Ahlawat, Danish Husain, Rajit Kapur and Shishir Sharma
.

References

External links

 The Bard of Blood at Penguin Books

2015 Indian novels
Indian literature in English
English-language novels
Indian novels adapted into television shows
Penguin Books India books
Research and Analysis Wing in fiction
Pakistani spy novels
India–Pakistan relations in popular culture
2015 debut novels